The 15th Kentucky Cavalry Regiment was a cavalry regiment that served in the Union Army during the American Civil War.

Service
The 15th Kentucky Cavalry Regiment was organized at Owensboro, Kentucky and mustered in for one year under the command of Lieutenant Colonel Gabriel Netter.

The regiment was attached to District of Columbus, Kentucky, Department of the Tennessee, to November 1862. District of Columbus, Kentucky, XIII Corps, Department of the Tennessee, to January 1863. District of Columbus, Kentucky, XVI Corps, to August 1863. Detached Brigade, District of Columbus, Kentucky, 6th Division, XVI Corps, to October 1863.

The 15th Kentucky Cavalry mustered out of service beginning October 6, 1863, and ending October 29, 1863.

Detailed service
Garrison duty at Paducah, Kentucky, and at various points in District of Columbus until October 1863. Scout from Fort Heiman into Tennessee May 26-June 2, 1863 (Companies A and D). Spring Creek, Tennessee, June 29. Lexington, Tennessee, June 29. Expedition from Clifton in pursuit of Biffle's, Forrest's and Newsome's Cavalry July 22–27. Expedition from Paducah, Kentucky, to McLemoresville, Tennessee, September 20–30.

Casualties
The regiment lost a total of 58 men during service; 1 officer and 2 enlisted men killed or mortally wounded, 1 officer and 54 enlisted men died of disease.

Commanders
 Lieutenant Colonel Gabriel Netter

See also

 List of Kentucky Civil War Units
 Kentucky in the Civil War

References
 Dyer, Frederick H. A Compendium of the War of the Rebellion (Des Moines, IA: Dyer Pub. Co.), 1908.
Attribution
 

Military units and formations established in 1862
Military units and formations disestablished in 1863
Units and formations of the Union Army from Kentucky
1862 establishments in Kentucky